Jean-Paul Savoie (born February 9, 1947) is a social worker and former politician in New Brunswick, Canada, who represented Restigouche West in the Legislative Assembly of New Brunswick as a Liberal member from 1987 to 1999. He was defeated by Benoit Cyr when he ran for reelection in 1999.

He was born in Kedgwick, New Brunswick. In 1995, he was named Minister of State responsible for Regional Development Corporation and Northern Development. Savoie is currently mayor of Kedgwick, having been elected in 2001, 2004 and 2008.

References 
 Entry from Canadian Who's Who

1947 births
Living people
New Brunswick Liberal Association MLAs
Mayors of places in New Brunswick